Macaracas   is a historic town and corregimiento in Macaracas District, Los Santos Province, Panama with a population of 2,890 as of 2010. It is the seat of Macaracas District. Its population as of 1990 was 2,423; its population as of 2000 was 2,706.

References

Corregimientos of Los Santos Province
Populated places in Los Santos Province